Unni is used as a first name in Kerala, India.  In the Malayalam language, it is also used as an adjective meaning an infant boy.  Thus, Unnikrishnan or Unnikannan means Lord Krishna in the infant form and Unniyesu means Yesu (Jesus in Malayalam) in the infant form.  The word is also the name of a caste among Hindus in the Southern India State of Kerala.

The name Unni is also used as a surname by various sub-groups of Pushpaka Brahmins like Pushpakanunnis, Theeyattunnis and Pattarunnis (Karappuram Unni or Nattuppattar). There is a common belief that Unnis are sub-divided into Pushpakanunnis, Theeyattunnis and Pattarunnis. In fact these are entirely different communities in a common class of Kerala Brahmins and there were no inter caste marriages among these communities anciently.  Thiyattunnis were traditionally the performers of an ancient art form called Tīyāttu.  The famous Malayalam writer Kottarathil Sankunni was a Tīyāttunni  whereas famous essayist D. Padmanabhan Unni was a Pushpakanunni. Thiyattunnis have the right for Tantric Poojas and other privileges enjoyed by the Nambudiri caste.

People
Notable people with name/surname Unni include:
Unni Mary, Indian film actress and producer
Unni Menon, Indian film playback singer
Unni Mukundan (born 1987), Indian film actor
Unni R. (born Jayachandran Parameswaran in 1971), Indian writer 
Divya Unni (born 1981), Indian actress of Malayalam  and Tamil  films
E. P. Unny, Indian political cartoonist.
K. S. Neelakantan Unni (1895–1980), Sanskrit scholar, compiled many legends about temples, famous persons, etc. and translated Kalidasa's Shakuntalam to Malayalam
Kottarathil Sankunni, Malayalam writer
M. K. Unni Nayar (1911–1950), Indian journalist 
Monisha Unni (1971–1992), Indian film actress
P. Unni, Indian politician 
P. Unnikrishnan  (born 1966), Carnatic vocalist and playback singer
R. S. Unni (1925–1999), Indian politician
Urmila Unni, Indian dancer and actress
Utthara Unni, Indian film actress
V.K. Unni, Indian academic
Varun Unni, Indian film composer and singer
Vidhya Unni, Indian film actress
Unni Raja, Indian Grandfather of Charles Raja
 Narayanan Parameswaran Unni (1936-), Sanskrit scholar, former Vice-Chancellor of the Sri Sankaracharya University of Sanskrit, Kalady, Kerala (1996 – 2000)
Sandeep Unnikrishnan, Indian Army Officer
B. Unnikrishnan, Indian (Kerala) Movie director

See also
 Brahmin

References

 Tiyyatunnikal by S Damodaran Unni

Malayali Brahmins
Social groups of Kerala
Indian surnames